The men's 150 + 300 + 450 + 600 medley relay event at the 1967 European Indoor Games was held on 11 and 12 March in Prague. The first athlete ran one lap of the 150-metre track, the second two, the third three and the anchor four, thus 10 laps or 1500 metres in total.

Results

Heats
First 2 teams in each heat (Q) qualified directly for the final.

Final

References

4 × 400 metres relay at the European Athletics Indoor Championships
Relay